Shepeli is a rural locality (a village) in Bereznikovskoye Rural Settlement, Sobinsky District, Vladimir Oblast, Russia. The population was 35 as of 2010.

Geography 
Shepeli is located 13 km south of Sobinka (the district's administrative centre) by road. Levino is the nearest rural locality.

References 

Rural localities in Sobinsky District